Norman is a 2010 drama film directed by Jonathan Segal. It stars Dan Byrd, Emily VanCamp, Adam Goldberg, and Richard Jenkins. The film features an original score and songs by multi-instrumentalist Andrew Bird. Norman began its theatrical release at various U.S. locations on October 21, 2011.

Plot

Cast
Dan Byrd as Norman Long
Emily VanCamp as Emily Harris
Richard Jenkins as Doug Long
Adam Goldberg as Mr. Angelo
Billy Lush as James
Camille Mana as Helen Black
Jesse Head as Bradley
John Aylward as Robert Bessent
Sewell Whitney as Dr. Malloy

Soundtrack
The film's soundtrack features, in majority, songs composed and performed by multi-instrumentalist Andrew Bird. Included in the soundtrack are three songs performed by other notable acts: The Blow with Richard Swift (singer-songwriter), Chad VanGaalen, and Wolf Parade. Pitchfork Media reviewed the album most favorably as a piece detached from the film. The soundtrack was released by Mom + Pop Music on October 11, 2011.

Reception
Emily VanCamp won the Best Actress Award at the San Diego Film Festival for her performance in this film in 2010.

References

External links
 
 
 Interview with the film's music supervisor, HitQuarters Jan 2012

2010 films
2010 drama films
American drama films
2010s English-language films
2010s American films